The 2005 SMU Mustangs football team represented Southern Methodist University (SMU) as a member the West Division of Conference USA (C-USA) during the 2005 NCAA Division I-A football season. Led by fourth-year head coach Phil Bennett, the Mustangs compiled an overall record of 5–6 with a mark of 4–4 in conference play, tying for third place in C-USA's West Division.

Schedule

Roster

References

SMU
SMU Mustangs football seasons
SMU Mustangs football